December 31 (Kannada: ಡಿಸೆಂಬರ್ ೩೧) is a 1988 Indian Kannada film, directed by Manobala and produced by P. Padmanabham. The film stars Vishnuvardhan, Urvashi, Jai Jagadish and Sulakshana. The film has musical score by Chellapilla Satyam.

Cast

Vishnuvardhan
Urvashi
Jai Jagadish
Sulakshana
Pavithra
Anuradha in Guest Appearance
Vasudeva Rao
Mysore Lokesh
Lakshman
Shashivardhan
Ravichandra
Madhu
Chinni Jayanth
Lohithaswa
V. R. Bhaskar
Seetharam
Dr. Rudresh
Ashwath Narayan
Meese Krishna
Ranga
Janardhan
Sathyabhama
Seema

References

External links
 
 

1980s Kannada-language films
Films scored by Satyam (composer)
Films directed by Manobala